The Zen Diaries of Garry Shandling is an American documentary film that premiered on HBO in two parts on March 26 and 27, 2018. Directed and produced by Judd Apatow, the film explores the life and legacy of comedian Garry Shandling.

Premise
The Zen Diaries of Garry Shandling features "interviews from nearly four dozen friends, family and colleagues; four decades’ worth of television appearances; and a lifetime of personal journals, private letters and home audio and video footage."

Persons featured
The documentary features the voice of actor Michael Cera reading various excerpts from Shandling's diaries and includes interviews with: 

 Peter Berg
 James L. Brooks
 Jim Carrey
 Sacha Baron Cohen
 Dave Coulier
 David Duchovny
 Linda Doucett
 Jon Favreau
 Maya Forbes
 Al Jean
 Jay Leno
 Kevin Nealon
 Conan O'Brien
 Mike Reiss
 Bob Saget
 Jerry Seinfeld
 Sarah Silverman
 Gavin de Becker
 Brad Grey (archived footage)
 Adam Sandler (archive footage)
 Merrill Markoe
 Jeffrey Tambor
 Peter Tolan
 Paul Willson
 Alan Zweibel

Production
On February 6, 2017, it was reported that Judd Apatow was developing a documentary on his mentor and friend Garry Shandling. A day later, Apatow made a public plea, via his official Twitter account, for anyone with photographs, videos, or information about Shandling to reach out to him.

On January 11, 2018, it was announced at the annual Television Critics Association's winter press tour that cable network HBO had acquired the documentary and planned to premiere it in two parts on March 26 and 27, 2018.

Release

Marketing
On February 21, 2018, HBO released the first trailer for the film. A week later, the official poster was released as well.

Premiere
On March 14, 2018, the series held its official premiere at Avalon Hollywood in Los Angeles, California. The event was attended by various celebrities including Bob Saget, Kevin Nealon, Vanessa Bayer, Kathy Griffin and Regis Philbin.

Reception

Critical response
The Zen Diaries of Garry Shandling has been met with a positive response from critics. On the review aggregation website Rotten Tomatoes, the film holds a 93% approval rating with an average rating of 8.4 out of 10, based on 15 reviews. Metacritic, which uses a weighted average, assigned the season a score of 90 out of 100 based on 9 critics, indicating "universal acclaim".

In a positive review, Newsdays Verne Gay gave the film four out of four stars and said, "Diaries is for Shandling fans, certainly, but it’s especially for any kid who might want to become a comic, or write for TV or get into this industry. Zen Diaries is a nearly five-hour-long master’s degree in “the business,” and also a sober, clear-eyed view of the risks as much as the rewards." His ultimate summation of his opinion of the film reads, "Brilliant portrait of an iconic comic, but an especially moving and human one, too." Offering similar praise, Steve Greene of IndieWire gave the film a grade of "A−" and said, "As a tribute, a eulogy, and an appreciation, The Zen Diaries is a even-handed look at someone who sought to bring meaningful change into other people’s lives as he searched for that same sense of fulfillment himself. Even if the film didn’t actually include footage from a ceremony remembering and celebrating Shandling’s life, you’d feel like you were already part of one." In another enthusiastic critique, The Hollywood Reporters Daniel Fienberg said, "Presented over two nights, but easy to digest in a single sitting, Zen Diaries is a worthwhile account of Shandling's career and evolving philosophy, an insightful exploration of stand-up comedy and the comedic voice, and a sad contemplation and reckoning from those Shandling left behind and those grappling with his legacy." In a one sentence "bottom line" abridgment of his review he writes that the film is, "Essential for Shandling fans, a superb introduction for neophytes."

Ratings
Upon their premiere, part one of the documentary was viewed by 268,000 people and part two was viewed by 286,000 people.

Awards and nominations

See also
List of HBO Films films

References

External links
The Zen Diaries of Garry Shandling on HBO

2018 television films
American documentary films
Films directed by Judd Apatow
Films scored by Michael Andrews
HBO documentary films
Documentary films about comedy and comedians
2018 documentary films
2018 films
Primetime Emmy Award-winning broadcasts
2010s American films
2010s English-language films
English-language documentary films